Hot Karl is an American rapper.

Hot Karl may also refer to:

Hot Karl (slang), a sexual slang term for sex acts involving feces
Hot Karl Row, nickname for buildings at 20, 30 & 50 Bayard Street in Williamsburg, Brooklyn, designed by Karl Fischer
"Hot Karl", a song by Ten in the Swear Jar from Accordion Solo!, 2005